Nofomuli Taumoefolau (born 1956) is a former rugby union player. He played three tests for  before he debuted for  against a French selection team in 1985. He played for Sanyo since 1980 until the end of his career.

Taumoefolau was part of Japan's 1987 Rugby World Cup squad.

He is the uncle of Koliniasi Holani, who currently plays for Japan's national rugby union team.

References

External links

1956 births
Living people
Tongan expatriate rugby union players
Rugby union wings
Japanese rugby union players
Japan international rugby union players
Tongan rugby union players
Expatriate rugby union players in Japan
Tongan expatriate sportspeople in Japan
Tonga international rugby union players